Kolbjørn Sigurd Werner Varmann (23 December 1904 – 13 August 1980) was a Norwegian priest and politician for the Labour Party. He is known as Minister of Transport and Communications from 1955 to 1960, and also as County Governor of Finnmark.

Early life and career
He was born in Eid as a son of as a son of Anders Kornelius Karlsen (1871–1940) and Astrid Langeland (1879–1932). He enrolled as a student in 1924, and graduated with the cand.theol. degree in 1929. He worked as a school teacher in Nordfjordeid from 1930 to 1931 before becoming curate in the Diocese of Hålogaland in 1931. While holding this position, he founded the upper secondary school in Tysfjord. From 1935 he chaired the school board in the municipality, and in 1936 he became vicar in Tysfjord. During World War II he was a member of the Norwegian resistance movement, organizing illegal emigration to Sweden. He was arrested by the Nazi German authorities, but survived and was decorated with the Defence Medal 1940–1945.

National politics
After the war he returned to Tysfjord as a vicar. He was also the dean of Nordre Salten, but left both positions in 1963. He was also a lieutenant in the Home Guard from 1946 to 1958. He became involved in politics, serving as mayor of Tysfjord from 1945 to 1955, and was a member of Nordland county council during the same period. He was elected to the Parliament of Norway from Nordland in 1950, and was re-elected on three occasions, the last term ending in 1965. From January 1955 to April 1960 he was the Minister of Transport and Communications in Gerhardsen's Third Cabinet. During this time his seat in parliament was taken by Margith Johanne Munkebye and Rolf Hellem. His career ended with the post of County Governor of Finnmark, which he held from 1965 to 1974. He was appointed in 1963, but since he was a parliament member, Anders Aune served as Acting County Governor.

He was also a deputy board member of the Office of the Auditor General of Norway, a board member of Utbyggingsfondet for Nord-Norge. He was awarded the HM The King's Medal of Merit in gold in 1980, but never physically received the medal as he died in August 1980.

References

1904 births
1980 deaths
People from Eid, Norway
Norwegian priest-politicians
Norwegian resistance members
Labour Party (Norway) politicians
Mayors of places in Nordland
Members of the Storting
Government ministers of Norway
County governors of Norway
Ministers of Transport and Communications of Norway
20th-century Norwegian politicians
Recipients of the King's Medal of Merit in gold